Lindsey Davis (born 1949) is an English historical novelist, best known as the author of the Falco series of historical crime stories set in ancient Rome and its empire. She is a recipient of the Cartier Diamond Dagger award.

Life and career
Davis was born in Birmingham and after taking a degree in English literature at Oxford University (Lady Margaret Hall), she became a civil servant for 13 years. When a romantic novel she had written was runner up for the 1985 Georgette Heyer Historical Novel Prize, she decided to become a writer, at first writing romantic serials for the UK women's magazine Woman's Realm.

Her dedication of the book Rebels and Traitors (2009) reads: "For Richard / dearest and closest of friends / your favourite book / in memory", and the author's website relates: "I am still getting used to life without my dear Richard. For those of you who haven't seen this before, he died in October [2008]." The author says in her publisher's newsletter: "The greatest recommendation I can give is that Richard, its first reader, thought it wonderful. He devoured chunks, demanding ‘Bring more story!’ even when he was in hospital. One of the last things I was ever able to tell him was that Rebels and Traitors was to be published by Random House, so I would be working with dear friends for his favourite book."

Davis suffered from the eye condition keratoconus from childhood, and in adulthood had a corneal transplant, about which she has said: "A stranger's generosity freed me from years of pain and anxiety" and urges her readers to carry a donor card.

Writing
Davis's interest in history and archaeology led to her writing an historical novel about Vespasian and his lover Antonia Caenis (The Course of Honour), for which she could not find a publisher. She tried again, and her first novel featuring the Roman "detective", Marcus Didius Falco, The Silver Pigs (1989), set in the same time period, was the start of her runaway success as a writer of historical whodunnits.  A further 19 Falco novels have followed, as well as The Course of Honour, which was published in 1997.  She published Falco: The Official Companion in June 2010.

Rebels and Traitors, set in the period of the English Civil War, was published in September 2009.

Master and God, published in March 2012, is set in ancient Rome and concerns the emperor Domitian.

In 2012, Davis and her publishers, Hodder & Stoughton in the UK and St. Martin's Press in the US, announced that she was writing a new series of books centred on Flavia Albia, Falco's British-born adopted daughter and "an established female investigator". The first title, The Ides of April was published on 11 April 2013 in the UK, and its sequel, Enemies at Home, was published in 2014, followed by annual additions. In an interview in 2019 Davis discussed her plan to write an Albia novel set on each of the seven hills of Rome, starting with the Aventine Hill in the book The Ides of April and culminating with the Capitoline Hill in the book A Capitol Death.  She has since published three more Albia books, set in particular locations just outside the wall of Rome. 

Davis has won many literary awards, including in 2011 the Cartier Diamond Dagger of the Crime Writers' Association given to authors who have made an outstanding lifetime's contribution to the genre. She was honorary president of the Classical Association from 1997 to 1998, and is a life member of the Council of the Society of Authors.

Published works

Marcus Didius Falco 
 The Silver Pigs (1989)
 Shadows in Bronze (1990)
 Venus in Copper (1991)
 The Iron Hand of Mars (1992)
 Poseidon's Gold (1993)
 Last Act in Palmyra (1994)
 Time to Depart (1995)
 A Dying Light in Corduba (1996)
 Three Hands in the Fountain (1997)
 Two for the Lions (1998)
 One Virgin Too Many (1999)
 Ode to a Banker (2000)
 A Body in the Bath House (2001)
 The Jupiter Myth (2002)
 The Accusers (2003)
 Scandal Takes a Holiday (2004)
 See Delphi and Die (2005)
 Saturnalia (2007)
 Alexandria (2009)
 Nemesis (2010)

Omnibus editions
 Falco on His Metal (1999)
 Venus in Copper
 The Iron Hand of Mars
 Poseidon's Gold
 Falco on the Loose (2003)
 Last Act in Palmyra
 Time to Depart
 A Dying Light in Corduba

Associated publication
 Falco: The Official Companion (2010)

Flavia Albia
Novels
 The Ides of April (2013, Hodder & Stoughton)
 Enemies at Home (2014, Hodder & Stoughton  
 Deadly Election (2015)
 The Graveyard of the Hesperides (2016, Hodder & Stoughton)
 The Third Nero (2017, Hodder & Stoughton)
Pandora's Boy (2018, Hodder & Stoughton) 
A Capitol Death (2019, Hodder & Stoughton)
The Grove of the Caesars (2020, Hodder & Stoughton)
A Comedy of Terrors (2021) 
Desperate Undertaking (7 April 2022, Hodder & Stoughton)
Fatal Legacy, 2023

Novellas
 The Spook Who Spoke Again (2015, ebook and audio only)
 Vesuvius by Night (2017, ebook and audio only)
 Invitation to Die (2019, ebook and audio only)

Other novels 
 The Course of Honour (1997)
 Rebels and Traitors (2009)
 Master and God (2012)
 A Cruel Fate (3 February 2014), (a QuickRead set in the English Civil War)

Short Stories 

 "'Going Anywhere Nice?'" (2005), published in The Detection Collection, edited by Simon Brett.

Awards and nominations
 Short listed for the Georgette Heyer Prize for two unpublished works (pre-Falco).
 Winner of the Author's Club Prize for "Best First Novel" in 1989 for The Silver Pigs.
 Winner of the Crime Writers' Association (CWA): Dagger in the Library for being an author "whose work has given most pleasure" in 1995. 
 Winner of the first Ellis Peters Historical Dagger awarded by the Crime Writers' Association in 1999 for Two for the Lions.
 Winner of the Sherlock Award for the Best Comic Detective in 2000 for Didius Falco. 
 Awarded the 2010 Premio Colosseo, awarded by the city of Rome to someone who "has enhanced the image of Rome in the world"
 Winner of the 2011 Cartier Diamond Dagger from the Crime Writers' Association 
 Winner in 2013 of the first Barcelona Historical Novel Prize (Premi Internacional de Novella Històrica Barcino)

References

External links

 The official website of Lindsey Davis
 Interview with Lindsey Davis
 RandomHouse Publisher's newsletters
 Hodder & Stoughton Publisher's newsletters
Lindsey Davis speaks to the Dorothy Dunnett Society 1h27m video of 2018 talk and Q&A session
Lindsey Davis talks about The Grove of the Caesars, 28 March 2020 50 minute video: Davis talks about her life and writing

1949 births
20th-century English novelists
21st-century English novelists
20th-century English women writers
21st-century English women writers
English crime fiction writers
English mystery writers
English women novelists
Alumni of Lady Margaret Hall, Oxford
English historical novelists
Writers of historical mysteries
Living people
Writers from Birmingham, West Midlands
Writers of historical fiction set in antiquity
Women mystery writers
Women historical novelists
Cartier Diamond Dagger winners
Presidents of the Classical Association